Thomas Braidwood (1715–1806) was a Scottish educator, significant in the history of deaf education. He was the founder of Britain's first school for the deaf.

Early life
The fourth child of Thomas Braidwood and Agnes Meek, Braidwood was born in 1715 at Hillhead Farm, Covington, South Lanarkshire, Scotland.

Professional career

Teaching career in Scotland
Braidwood originally established himself as a writing teacher, instructing the children of the wealthy at his home in the Canongate in Edinburgh.

In 1760, he accepted his first deaf pupil, Charles Shirreff (1749–1829), who later became known as a painter of portrait miniatures. Shirreff, then ten years old, was the son of Alexander Shirreff, a wealthy wine merchant based at the port of Leith, who convinced Braidwood to undertake to teach the deaf-mute child to write.

Braidwood changed his vocation from teaching hearing pupils to teaching the deaf, and renamed his building Braidwood's Academy for the Deaf and Dumb, the first school of its kind in Britain. Braidwood developed a combined system for educating deaf students, which included a form of sign language and the study of articulation and lip reading. This early use of sign language was the forerunner of British Sign Language, recognized as a language in its own right in 2003.

In October 1773, Dr. Samuel Johnson visited the school while traveling through Scotland, and wrote:

Teaching career in London
In 1783 Thomas Braidwood moved with his family to Hackney on the eastern outskirts of London, and established the Braidwood Academy for the Deaf and Dumb in Grove House, off Mare Street. 

Joseph Watson, a nephew of Braidwood, began working with him in 1784. In 1792, Dr. Watson went on to become the first head teacher of the Asylum for the Deaf and Dumb, which was established on Old Kent Road in Bermondsey. Watson's pupils included England's first deaf barrister, John William Lowe.

Braidwood died in 1806, in the parish of Hackney.

Notable students
In addition to the painter Charles Shirreff, Braidwood's pupils included:
 John Goodricke, astronomer
 Francis Mackenzie, 1st Baron Seaforth, MP and governor of Barbados
 John Philip Wood, author, genealogist, editor and Over Deputy of the Scottish Excise Office
 Jane Poole, who set a precedent when a court accepted her last will as valid, even though she had communicated her wishes to the drafter exclusively by fingerspelling (being blind as well as deaf and mute)
 Thomas Arrowsmith, a portraitist and miniature painter

Personal life and family
Braidwood married Margaret Pearson on 1 October 1752. The couple had three daughters, all born in Edinburgh: Margaret, born 4 September 1755; Elizabeth born 1757; and Isabella, born 27 January 1758.

All three daughters followed Braidwood in becoming teachers of the deaf, and Isabella continued the running of the school after Braidwood's death in 1806. Little is known about Margaret, and there is no mention or record of her having moved south of the Scottish border with her family in 1783. Elizabeth married early to a Durham surgeon and went to live in his city.

A grandson, John Braidwood, began tutoring deaf students in Virginia in 1812, and ran the short-lived Cobbs School for the deaf from its founding in 1815 until its demise in the fall of 1816.

Braidwood was a distant cousin of Thomas Braidwood Wilson (1792–1843), after whom the Australian town of Braidwood, New South Wales is named.

Tribute
On 6 September 2017 Google celebrated the British Sign Language and the Braidwood Academy with a Google Doodle.

References

External links 

 Early deaf education, portion of a lecture with remarks on the Braidwoods.

1715 births
1806 deaths
Scottish schoolteachers
Educators of the deaf